John J. Riley was a Scottish amateur football wing half who played in the Scottish League for Queen's Park, Morton and Hamilton Academical.

Personal life 
Riley served as a private in the motor transport section of the Royal Army Service Corps during the First World War.

References

Year of birth missing
Scottish footballers
Scottish Football League players
British Army personnel of World War I
Association football wing halves
Queen's Park F.C. players
Royal Army Service Corps soldiers
Place of death missing
Place of birth missing
Year of death missing
Greenock Morton F.C. players
St Mirren F.C. players
Hamilton Academical F.C. players